An election to the Carmarthenshire County Council was held in April 1952. It was preceded by the 1949 election and followed, by the 1955 election.

Overview of the result

After capturing control of the Council for the first time in 1949, Labour strengthened their hold by gaining an additional six seats in the Llanelli area. These included the two new wards created after boundary changes and the two wards in Llanelli town lost in by-elections in 1949. This counterbalanced the loss of Llangeler where Labour did not field a candidate. This was augmented by taking seven of the nine vacancies on the aldermanic bench.

Boundary changes

Two additional seats were created, at Burry Port and Felinfoel.

Retiring aldermen

The aldermen who retired at the election were ...

Retiring Labour councillors Haydn Lewis and Evan Bevan stood down in Ammanford and Llandybie respectively to allow Aldermen Frank Davies, and D.B. Lewis to be returned unopposed. Likewise, H.H. Harries and J.H. Davies stood down in Llandissilio and Llansteffan in favour of Edward James and T.Ll. Harries. Aldermen John Phillips (Cwmamman) and J.D. Rees (St Clears) withdrew at the last moment.

Unopposed returns

34 members were returned unopposed, which included both rural and urban seats.

Contested elections

25 seats were contested, including a number of instances where rival Independents fought each other. As in 1949, Independents sought to fight elections in Llanelli as a group, but had little success. Following the elections, Labour held all nine wards in Llanelli town for the first time.

A number of retiring aldermen stood as candidates and were returned unopposed. In Carmarthen,  Alderman William Edwards, a member of the Council since 1928, stood in a town ward rather than in Llangunnor which he represented as a councilor until 1946. Edwards was defeated by the retiring Labour member.

Summary of results

This section summarises the detailed results which are noted in the following sections.

This table summarises the result of the elections in all wards. 53 councillors were elected.

|}

|}

|}

Ward results

Abergwili

Ammanford No.1

Ammanford No.2

Berwick

Burry Port East
Boundary Change

Burry Port West
Boundary Change

Caio

Carmarthen Division 1

Carmarthen Division 2

Carmarthen Division 3

Cenarth

Cilycwm

Conwil

Cwmamman

Felinfoel
Boundary Change

Hengoed
Boundary Change

Kidwelly

Laugharne

Llanarthney

Llanboidy

Llandebie North

Llandebie South

Llandilo Rural

Llandilo Urban

Llandovery

Llandyssilio

Llanedy

Llanegwad

Llanelly Division.1

Llanelly Division 2

Llanelly Division 3

Llanelly Division 4

Llanelly Division 5

Llanelly Division 6

Llanelly Division 7

Llanelly Division 8

Llanelly Division 9

Llanfihangel Aberbythick

Llanfihangel-ar-Arth

Llangadog

Llangeler

Llangendeirne

Llangennech

Llangunnor

Llanon

Llansawel

Llanstephan

Llanybyther

Myddfai

Pembrey

Pontyberem

Quarter Bach

Rhydcymmerai

St Clears

St Ishmaels

Trelech

Trimsaran

Westfa

Whitland

Election of aldermen

In addition to the 59 councillors the council consisted of 19 county aldermen. Aldermen were elected by the council, and served a six-year term. Following the elections, seven of the nine aldermanic vacancies were taken by Labour. The leader of the Labour group, Douglas Hughes, justified this by stating that the Independents had behaved in a similar fashion over many years.

 Joseph Howells, Labour
 D.B. Lewis, Labour
 Frank Davies, Labour
 John Harries, Labour
 Edgar Lewis, Labour
 D.J. Stone, Labour
 Gwilym R. Thomas, Labour
 Edward James, Independent
 T.Ll. Harries, Independent

By-elections
Following the selection of aldermen the following by-elections were held. Four members of the previous authority who had stood down in favour of retiring aldermen were now returned unopposed. The two contested elections included a strong showing by Plaid Cymru in Ammanford.

Ammanford No.1 by-election

Ammanford No.2 by-election

Felinfoel by-election

Hengoed by-election

Llanarthney by-election

Llandybie North by-election

Llandybie South by-election

Llandyssilio by-election

Llanstephan by-election

References

1952
1952 Welsh local elections